Wang Mengyi (born 25 September 1992) is a Chinese sport shooter.

She participated at the 2018 ISSF World Shooting Championships.

References

External links

1992 births
Chinese male sport shooters
Living people
ISSF pistol shooters
Shooters at the 2018 Asian Games
Asian Games competitors for China
21st-century Chinese people